Roman Józef Abraham (28 February 1891, Lwów – 26 August 1976, Warsaw) was a Polish cavalry general, commander of the Wielkopolska Cavalry Brigade during the German and Soviet Invasion of Poland in September 1939, and Battle of Bzura commander of Polish cavalry (combined cavalry unit). During the Second Polish Republic, he was Brigadier-General and, for a short period, from 1930 to 1931, Abraham was also a member of the Polish Parliament.

Early life and education
Abraham was born in Lwów, in what was then Austria-Hungary (later in Poland, now Lviv, Ukraine).  He was the son of Władysław Abraham, professor of Canon law and rector of the University of Lviv.  He studied at the Jesuit School in Chyrów in Bąkowice, graduating in 1910. He then studied at the Faculty of Philosophy and Law at Jan Kazimierz University in Lviv, graduating in 1915.

Military service

World War I
During World War I he served from August 1914 to October 1918 in the Austro-Hungarian army in the 1st Regiment of Uhlans of National Defence, fighting on the French, Romanian, Russian, Serbian and Italian fronts, ending his service as a Lieutenant in the cavalry.

Polish-Ukrainian War

At the end of World War I, he joined the Polish Military Cadres in Lwów. From 1 November 1918 in the reformed Polish Army in the rank of lieutenant, he was the commander of the Góra Strudenia sector in Lwów. 
He created his own unit, later called "Straceńcami". The unit fought successfully in various defences of Lwów, in the defence of Persenkówka, and in Śródmieście. 
The unit raised the Polish banner at the Lwów City Hall at dawn on 22 November, and on 24 November 1918 he was appointed the rank of Captain. However, his troops were accused of numerous robberies. An account, for instance, cited that the Galician unit he commanded allegedly plundered from peasants living in captured Ukrainian villages, hauling all that could be transported to Lwów.
From January to August 1919 he commanded an independent battalion, regiment and Operational Group in the division of Colonel Władysław Sikorski. From August 1919, he was an officer in the operating department and an observer in the 59th Air Force Squadron. He also participated in Polish-Ukrainian battles around Przemyśl.

Polish-Bolshevik War 
In 1920, Abraham defended the city of Lwów during the Polish-Bolshevik War. He was wounded during the conflict but he continued performing his duties, commanding his unit whilst being carried on a stretcher.

World War II
He
Abraham commanded the Wielkopolska Cavalry Brigade of Army Group Poznan, under General Tadeusz Kutrzeba. From 1939-45 he was a Prisoner of War in Oflag VII-A Murnau in Germany. A handwritten card sent by Abraham to his friend in Chicago from his prison has been preserved, and is currently part of the Centralne Muzeum Jeńców Wojennych's collection.

Decorations 
 Virtuti Militari, Silver Cross (1922)
 Cross of Merit, Gold Cross (1930, 1938, 1940)
 Polonia Restituta, Officer's Cross (1933)
 Cross of Independence with Swords (1933)
 Virtuti Militari, Golden Cross (1961)
 Polonia Restituta, Commander's Cross (1970)
 Cross of Valour 5 times
 Lwów Defence Cross
 Légion d'honneur, Knight's Cross (France)

References

http://www.generals.dk/general/Abraham/Roman/Poland.html

1891 births
1976 deaths
Military personnel from Lviv
People from the Kingdom of Galicia and Lodomeria
Nonpartisan Bloc for Cooperation with the Government politicians
Members of the Sejm of the Second Polish Republic (1930–1935)
Association of the Polish Youth "Zet" members
Polish generals of the Second Polish Republic
Austro-Hungarian military personnel of World War I
Polish people of the Polish–Ukrainian War
Polish people of the Polish–Soviet War
Polish military personnel of World War II
Polish prisoners of war
World War II prisoners of war held by Germany
Recipients of the Gold Cross of the Virtuti Militari
Recipients of the Cross of Independence with Swords
Officers of the Order of Polonia Restituta
Chevaliers of the Légion d'honneur
Recipients of the Cross of Valour (Poland)
Recipients of the Gold Cross of Merit (Poland)